The Horn Lil' Trouble is a single-seat low-wing, homebuilt aircraft designed by Mark Horn.

Design and development
The wings and reversed struts were sourced from a Monocoupe. The fuselage is a modified Aeronca Defender. Landing gear and tail section is from a Piper Cub.

Specifications (Horn Lil' Trouble)

References

Homebuilt aircraft